Papyrus 120 (in the Gregory-Aland numbering), designated by 𝔓120, is an early copy of a small part of the New Testament in Greek. It is a papyrus manuscript of the Gospel of John. The surviving texts of John are verses 1:25-28,38-44, they are in a fragmentary condition. The manuscript palaeographically has been assigned to the 4th century (INTF).

The text is written in one column per page, and 27 lines per page (reconstructed).

 Location 
The manuscript is currently housed at the Papyrology Rooms of the Sackler Library at Oxford with the shelf number P. Oxy. 4804.

See also 

 List of New Testament papyri
 Oxyrhynchus Papyri

References

Further reading 

 R. Hatzilambrou, P. J. Parsons, J. Chapa The Oxyrhynchus Papyri LXXI (London: 2007), pp. 6–9.

External links

Images 
 P.Oxy.LXIV 4804 from Papyrology at Oxford's "POxy: Oxyrhynchus Online"

Official registration 
 "Continuation of the Manuscript List" Institute for New Testament Textual Research, University of Münster. Retrieved April 9, 2008

New Testament papyri
4th-century biblical manuscripts
Gospel of John papyri